Robert Conrad Khayat (born April 18, 1938) was the 15th Chancellor of the University of Mississippi. He also played American football as a placekicker, guard, and center for Ole Miss and in the National Football League (NFL) for the Washington Redskins during the 1960, 1962 and 1963 seasons. He was appointed Chancellor in 1995.

Early years
Khayat was born in Moss Point, Mississippi, to Lebanese parents. He attended Moss Point High School and the University of Mississippi. He received both bachelor of arts and Juris Doctor degrees from the University of Mississippi. He also played football for the Ole Miss Rebels football team from 1957 to 1959. He also received an LL.M. degree from Yale University.

Professional football career
Khayat was selected by the Cleveland Browns in the 1960 NFL Draft. He was then traded to the Washington Redskins in April 1960. He played for the Redskins during the 1960, 1962, and 1963 seasons. Following the 1960 season, he was named to the Pro Bowl squad. He appeared in a total of 40 NFL games and kicked 38 field goals and 90 extra points.

His brother Eddie Khayat also played and coached in the NFL.

Later years
Khayat later became a lawyer and taught law at the University of Mississippi School of Law.

He was appointed chancellor in 1995. In one of his first acts as chancellor, Khayat arranged for a $5.4 million gift from Jim and Sally Barksdale to establish an honors college at the university. In 1996, with enrollment declining, Khayat retained the public relations firm, Burson-Marsteller, to conduct a survey of public perception — including university symbols. When The New York Times reported on the review, which included the Confederate Flag and other Old South symbols, a media frenzy ensued.

On January 6, 2009, Khayat announced his retirement effective June 30, 2009. He was succeeded by Daniel Jones on June 15, 2009.

Khayat's memoir, The Education of a Lifetime, was published on September 10, 2013.

References

1938 births
Living people
American football placekickers
American people of Lebanese descent
Chancellors of the University of Mississippi
Eastern Conference Pro Bowl players
Ole Miss Rebels athletic directors
Ole Miss Rebels football players
People from Moss Point, Mississippi
University of Mississippi alumni
University of Mississippi School of Law alumni
Washington Redskins players
Yale University alumni
Players of American football from Mississippi
Writers from Mississippi
Sportspeople of Lebanese descent